Jardine Airport Services Limited (JASL) trading as Jardine Aviation Services and JASG, formed in 1988 as a joint venture of Jardine Matheson (via Jardine Pacific) and Air China Group (via CNAC(G)). However, Jardines' involvement in Hong Kong aviation began as early as 1946 as Jardine Airways (later merged as Hong Kong Airways).

It offers a complete range of ground handling services at the Hong Kong International Airport.

As at 2002, it handles a quarter of aircraft movements, and over 17% of total passenger throughput, at the Hong Kong International Airport.

Ground Handling Services
Passenger Services
Check-in Services
Reception and Boarding Services
Baggage Lost and Found Services
Ticketing and Passenger Information Services
Operations Control
Flight operations
Crew administration / centralized crew administration
Load control / centralized load control
Turnaround coordination
Manpower planning 
Cargo Services
Ramp Services

Customers Airlines  

The company serves over 60 international passenger and cargo airlines:

AeroLogic
Air Canada
Air China
Air China Cargo
Air France
Air New Zealand	
Air Macau
All Nippon Airways	
Atlas Air
Bassaka Air
British Airways
Cebu Pacific
China Cargo Airlines
China Eastern Airlines
China Southern Airlines
Eastar Jet

El Al
EVA Air
Emirates
Finnair
Garuda Indonesia
Gulf Air
Jeju Air
Jetstar Asia Airways
Jetstar Japan
Jin Air
KLM
Korean Air
Lufthansa
Lufthansa Cargo
Mandarin Airlines
MIAT Mongolian Airlines
Myanmar National Airlines

Nippon Cargo Airlines
Pacific Airlines
Peach Aviation
Philippine Airlines
Polar Air Cargo
Shanghai Airlines
Sichuan Airlines
Singapore Airlines
Southern Air
SriLankan Airlines
Swiss International Air Lines
Virgin Atlantic
Xiamen Airlines

Jardine Aviation Academy
Jardine Aviation Academy (JAA), an IATA Regional Training Partner (RTP) that delivers IATA ground operation trainings.

References

External links
Official website
Ground handling agents at Hong Kong International Airport

Transport operators of Hong Kong
Aviation in Hong Kong
Jardine Matheson Group
Government-owned companies of China
Aircraft ground handling companies